The Australian telephone numbering plan describes the allocation of phone numbers in Australia.  It has changed many times, the most recent major reorganisation by the Australian Communications & Media Authority taking place between 1994 and 1998.

Overview 
For landline telephony, Australia is now geographically divided into four large areas, three of which cover more than one state and/or territory. All local telephone numbers within these four areas are of eight digits, consisting (mainly) of a four digit exchange code plus a four digit number. The national significant number consists of a single digit area code followed by the local eight digit number – a total of nine digits. Within Australia, to access the number of a landline telephone in an area other than that in which the caller is located (including callers using mobile phones), it is first necessary to dial the Australian trunk code of 0 plus the area code, followed by the local number. Thus, the full national number (FNN) has ten digits: 0x xxxx xxxx.

00 International and Emergency access (see below for details)
01 Alternative phone services
014 Satellite phones
0163 Pager numbers
0198 Data numbers (e.g. 0198 308 888 is the dial-up PoP number for Telstra)  
02 Geographic: Central East region (NSW, ACT)
03 Geographic: South-east region (VIC, TAS)
04 Digital Mobile services (3G, 4G, 5G and GSM)
0550 Location Independent Communication Services
07 Geographic: North-east region (QLD)
08 Geographic: Central and West region (SA, NT, WA)
1 Non-geographic numbers (mostly for domestic use only; see below for details)

The current numbering plan would appear to be sufficient to cope with potential increase in demand for services for quite some time to come. The 06 and 09 area codes are completely unused.  In addition, each current area code has large number ranges unallocated.

When dialling from outside Australia, after dialling the appropriate International Access Code it is necessary to dial the Country Code for Australia (61) followed by the nine digit national significant number. (The + symbol is used to represent the International Access Code, e.g. +61 3 xxxx xxxx for a number in Victoria/Tasmania or +61 4xx xxx xxx for a mobile number). Some numbers beginning with a 1 may be dialled without any replacement, after dialling the required international access code and the country code for Australia (+61). (see below)

Australian local area numbers are eight digits in length, conventionally written in the form xxxx xxxx. Mobile numbers are written in the form of ten digits in length, when dialed within Australia, the 0 must be included, plus 4, which indicates the service required is a mobile number. Mobile numbers are conventionally written 04xx xxx xxx. If a landline or mobile number is written where it may be viewed by an international audience (e.g. in an email signature or on a website) then the number is often written as +61 x xxxx xxxx or +61 4xx xxx xxx respectively.

(The "Australian national trunk access code" of 0 is not used for calls originated from locations outside Australia.)

Geographic numbers
Fixed line telephone numbers in Australia

(Within Australia, to access a number in another area it is first necessary to dial the trunk code of 0, followed by the area code and then the specific local number).

In major centres, the first four digits specify the CCA (Call Collection Area, also known as an exchange), and the remaining digits specify a number at that exchange, up to 10,000 of which may be connected. Smaller exchanges in more remote areas may mean that no more than 100 numbers could be connected to such exchanges.

To access numbers in the same area, it is necessary only to dial the eight digits concerned.  To access a number in another area it is first necessary to dial the trunk code of 0, followed by the area code (2, 3, 7 or 8) and then the specific local number.

The area codes do not exactly match state/territory boundaries. Notable are the part of New South Wales around Broken Hill (a large part of the state's area but less than 1% of its population), which uses (08) 80xx numbers, and Wodonga, which is in Victoria but is within the New South Wales (02) area code. Similarly New South Wales border towns including Deniliquin and Buronga are within the South East (Victorian) (03) area code. Physical exchanges can be allocated one or more prefixes and modern technology allows sub-sets of these number ranges to be allocated to switching entities physically located at a distance from the exchange in which their controlling terminal is located. (Thus, the concept of what a "telephone exchange" is can become somewhat blurred.)

Landlines use an open dialling plan: if the caller's phone shares the same area code as the called phone, the area code may be omitted. For example, a call from the number (02) 5551 5678, to the number (02) 7010 1111, will be connected if the caller dials only 7010 1111. Similarly, a person who dials 7010 5678 on a land-line or mobile phone in Melbourne (i.e., within the 03 area) will be connected to 03 7010 5678. For this reason, landline numbers are often specified without the area code. If a person's number and the destination number share the same area code, then the area code is not required, even if it is not a local (untimed) call.

However, the full international number must always be dialled, since the Australian telephone network has the capability to recognise when the destination required is either international, in a different national area or within the local area and to switch and charge the call accordingly.  Thus, it is strongly recommended that telephone numbers should be stored in mobile phones in the form of the full international number, should the owner of the phone be likely to use the phone concerned in an area away from home, either within Australia or internationally.

Mobile phones
Within Australia, mobile phone numbers begin with 04 or 05 – the Australian national trunk code 0, plus the mobile indicator 4 or 5 – followed by eight digits. This is generally written as 04XX XXX XXX within Australia, or as +61 4XX XXX XXX for an international audience.  Whilst this format may be viewed as incorrect, it is the result of mobile carriers advertising numbers in such a way so as to clearly identify the owning telco prior to mobile number portability, introduced on 25 September 2001.  Prior to MNP, mobile operators generally reserved number ranges in blocks of 04 xy z.

The xy-digit codes (sometimes xy z) are allocated per network, although with the introduction of number portability, there is no longer a fixed relationship between the mobile phone number and the network it uses.

In 2015 the 05 prefix (other than 0550) was also reserved for digital mobile phones as a part of the Telecommunications Numbering Plan 2015. However, as of 2019 no numbers have been allocated with this prefix.

Within Australia, mobile numbers must always be dialed with all 10 digits, regardless of the caller's location.

Geographic numbers
Geographical areas are identified by the first few digits of the local number:

Central-East region (02)
02 37	Armidale, Tamworth, Northern Tablelands
02 38	Bowral, Crookwell, Goulburn, Marulan
02 39	Griffith, Wagga Wagga, Riverina
02 40	Newcastle, Lower Hunter
02 41	Newcastle, Lower Hunter
02 42	Wollongong
02 43	Gosford, Central Coast
02 44	Batemans Bay, Moruya, Nowra
02 45	Windsor, Richmond
02 46	Campbelltown
02 47	Penrith, Blue Mountains
02 48	Bowral, Crookwell, Goulburn, Marulan
02 49	Newcastle, Lower Hunter
02 50	Albury, Corryong, Wodonga
02 51	Canberra, Queanbeyan, Yass
02 52	Canberra, Queanbeyan, Yass 
02 53	Bathurst, Orange
02 54	Bega, Merimbula, Tathra, Cooma
02 55	Port Macquarie, Kempsey, Taree, Lord Howe Island, Muswellbrook
02 56	Murwillumbah, Grafton, Lismore
02 57	Armidale, Tamworth, Northern Tablelands
02 58	Bourke, Dubbo, Far West
02 59	Griffith, Wagga Wagga, Riverina 
02 60	Albury, Corryong, Wodonga
02 61	Canberra, Queanbeyan, Yass
02 62	Canberra, Queanbeyan, Yass
02 63	Bathurst, Orange, Cowra
02 64	Bega, Merimbula, Tathra, Cooma
02 65	Port Macquarie, Kempsey, Taree, Lord Howe Island, Muswellbrook
02 66	Coffs Harbour, Grafton, Lismore, Murwillumbah
02 67	Armidale, Glen Innes, Gunnedah, Inverell, Moree, Narrabri, Tamworth
02 68	Bourke, Dubbo, Cobar
02 69	Griffith, Wagga Wagga, Riverina
02 7	Sydney
02 8	Sydney 
02 9	Sydney

South-east region (03)
03 32	Geelong, Colac
03 33	Ballarat
03 34	Bendigo
03 40	Mildura, Balranald
03 41	Traralgon, Bairnsdale
03 42	Geelong, Colac 
03 43	Ballarat
03 44	Bendigo
03 45	Warrnambool
03 47	Wangaratta
03 48	Deniliquin, Numurkah, Shepparton
03 49	Mornington 
03 50	Mildura, Balranald
03 51	Traralgon, Bairnsdale
03 52	Colac, Geelong
03 53	Ballarat
03 54	Bendigo
03 55	Warrnambool, Casterton, Portland
03 56	Drouin, Foster, Warragul, Wonthaggi
03 57	Wangaratta
03 58	Deniliquin, Shepparton
03 59	Mornington, Pakenham, Rosebud, Warburton, Yarra Ranges
03 61	Hobart
03 62	Hobart
03 63	Launceston
03 64	Devonport, Burnie, Queenstown
03 65	Devonport, Burnie, Queenstown
03 67	Launceston
03 7	Melbourne
03 8	Melbourne
03 9	Melbourne

North-east region (07)
07 2	Brisbane, Bribie Island
07 3	Brisbane, Bribie Island
07 40	Cairns, Far North Queensland
07 41	Bundaberg, Kingaroy, Maryborough
07 42	Cairns
07 43	Bundaberg, Kingaroy
07 44	Townsville, North Queensland
07 45	Toowoomba, Roma, south-west
07 46	Toowoomba, Roma, South West
07 47	Townsville, North Queensland
07 48	Rockhampton, Mackay
07 49	Rockhampton, Mackay, Gladstone
07 52	Sunshine Coast, Esk, Nambour, Gatton, Caboolture
07 53	Sunshine Coast, Esk, Nambour, Gatton, Caboolture 
07 54	Sunshine Coast, Esk, Nambour, Gatton, Caboolture
07 55	Gold Coast, Tweed Heads (NSW), Beaudesert
07 56	Gold Coast, Beaudesert
07 57	Gold Coast, Beaudesert
07 70	Cairns, Far North Queensland
07 75	Inglewood, Toowoomba
07 76	Inglewood, Toowoomba
07 77	Townsville, North Queensland
07 79	Rockhampton, Mackay, Gladstone

Central and West region (08)
08 25	Riverland, Murraylands 
08 26	Ceduna
08 51	Port Hedland
08 52	Perth
08 53	Perth
08 54	Perth
08 55	Bullsbrook East, Northam, Pinjarra (Mandurah)
08 58	Albany
08 60	Kalgoorlie, Merredin, Goldfields-Esperance
08 61	Perth
08 62	Perth
08 63	Perth
08 64	Perth
08 65	Perth
08 66	Moora
08 67	Bridgetown, Bunbury
08 68	Albany
08 69	Geraldton
08 70 Adelaide
08 71	Adelaide
08 72	Adelaide
08 73	Adelaide
08 74	Adelaide
08 75	Riverland, Murraylands
08 76	Ceduna
08 77	South East
08 78	Mid North
08 79 Northern Territory (Alice Springs, Darwin)
08 80	Broken Hill (NSW)
08 81	Adelaide
08 82	Adelaide
08 83	Adelaide
08 84	Adelaide
08 85	Riverland, Murraylands
08 86	Ceduna
08 87	South East
08 88	Mid North
08 89	Northern Territory (Alice Springs, Darwin)
08 90	Kalgoorlie
08 91	Derby [inc. Cocos/Keeling & Christmas Islands.]
08 92	Perth
08 93	Perth
08 94	Perth
08 95	Bullsbrook East, Northam, Pinjarra (Mandurah)
08 96	Moora
08 97	Bunbury, Busselton, Bridgetown, Collie, Harvey
08 98	Albany
08 99	Geraldton

Notes

Non-geographic numbers

Mobile phone numbers (04, 05)
Each mobile phone company is allocated numbers in blocks, which are listed below. However mobile number portability means an individual number might have been "ported". There are also many MVNOs which use numbers from their wholesaler or might have their own ranges.

ACMA planned to introduce the "05" range for mobile numbers in 2017, when the "04" range was expected to be exhausted. So far, no such numbers have been introduced.

The numbers 0491 570 156, 0491 570 157, 0491 570 158, 0491 570 159 and 0491 570 110 are reserved for fictitious use.

Satellite phone numbers (014)
Numbers beginning with 014 are predominantly used for satellite services. Parts of the 014 prefix had previously been used as a 9 digit, AMPS mobile phone access code.

The 01471 prefix is the ten-digit replacement for the previous, nine-digit ITERRA satellite phone code 0071 xxxxx. Prior to its use for ITERRA (and other satellite services). These numbers were allocated in March 1999.

0145xxxxxx numbers are used for services utilised on the Optus network in Australia. This is predominantly used for MobileSat and Thuraya mobile satellite services. These numbers were allocated in December 1992: 222,000 with the rest "spare".

The prefixes 0141, 0142, 0143, 0145 and 0147 are set aside for satellite systems; the rest of the 014 prefix range is currently not allocated to any other service type. There is not a lot of demand for these services, and many satellite phones now have normal mobile phone numbers (prefix 04), so it is not likely for the entire 014 range to be allocated to satellite services.

Location independent communications service (0550)
These numbers are designed for VoIP (Voice over Internet Protocol) systems, where they work like a fixed number but not allocated on a geographical level. It is possible that LICS numbers will be absorbed into mobile numbers in the future, as they provide similar features. Indeed, the July 2012 variation of the numbering plan allocated the rest of the 05 range to digital mobile numbering.

Data numbers (0198)
All calls to 0198 numbers are a "local call" cost like 13 and 1300 numbers but are used for Internet service provider access numbers. They are used both with dial-up modems and ISDN.

Obsolete numbers
Most numbers that are no longer used have been removed from the Telecommunications Numbering Plan 2015, whether in previous variations or in this complete replacement. (See below)

However, the 0163 prefix is still allocated for use with pagers. This was reduced from 016 in a variation to the previous numbering plan. As of March 2011 only 1000 numbers were allocated, and by the end of 2012 there were none allocated.

Non-geographic numbers (domestic use)
The following codes are not generally dialable from international points, but used in domestic dialling:

000 – Emergency (Police, Fire, Ambulance)
106 – TTY emergency (for the hearing-impaired)
11 – Community services
1100 – Before You Dig Australia (to prevent inadvertent damage to underground cables or infrastructure)
112 – Alternative access to Emergency Services (Police, Fire, Ambulance; diallable from GSM mobile phones only)
119x – Information services (e.g. 1194 was time (no longer available from 1 October 2019) and 1196 was weather (no longer available from 1 October 2019))
12 – Network services
1221 – International faults reporting service
1222 – Call costs and enquiries service
1223 – Directory assistance
1225 – International directory assistance
123x – Premium operator services (e.g. 1234 is Sensis personal assistance)
124xx – Other operator services (e.g. 12456 is Sensis Call Connect)
125xxx – Telstra mobile services (e.g. 125111 is Telstra mobile customer service)
1268x, 1268 xxxx and 1268 xxx xxx – Internal network services
127 – Testing numbers (e.g. 12722123 reads your number from a Telstra line, 12723123 reads your number for an Optus line) (length varies), dial 12722199 then hang up and the call is returned by the exchange (used to test handset functionality)
1282 – Call information service
128xx – Call information service
13 xx xx and 1300 xxx xxx – "Local Rate" calls, except for VoIP and mobile phone users
1345 xxxx – Local rate calls (only used for back-to-base monitored alarm systems)
14xx – Carrier override prefixes (e.g. 1411 is the override prefix for the Telstra network; see below for details)
180 xxxx and 1800 xxx xxx – FreeCall
183x – Caller identification override prefixes (1831 blocks caller-id sending while 1832 unblocks caller-id sending) 
188 xxxx – Premium SMS (since moved to 19 range)
189 xx – Calling card service
19 xx xx and 19xx xxxx – Premium SMS
190x xxx xxx – Premium rate services (usually 1902 and 1900)

Some notes:
These numbers do not have a Trunk Access Code prefix (0).
The 106 number is believed to be the first nationwide TTY emergency service in the world.
13 xx xx, 1300 xxx xxx and 1800 xxx xxx numbers can provide source-based routing, used by organisations such as pizza chains that advertise one number nationwide that connects customers to their nearest store.
Virtually all FreeCall numbers in use are 1800 xxx xxx, though some organisations do use the shorter 7-digit version.
Some of these numbers are dialable from locations outside Australia. It is up to the individual owner to set this up correctly (for 13 and 18 numbers at least) (e.g. +61 13x xxx)
911 will not re-route to triple zero as the prefix 911x has been allocated to landlines under the current numbering plan. 911 may redirect to 000 when using a mobile phone, like 112, but it is not encouraged as knowledge of these numbers causes confusion

Emergency services numbers (000, 106, 112)
000 is the primary emergency telephone number in Australia. Secondary emergency numbers are 106 (for use by the hearing impaired with a TTY terminal) and the international GSM mobile emergency telephone number 112.

Increased awareness of the 112 emergency number in Australia has led to the potential for confusion over which number to call in an emergency. As a secondary emergency number, 112 is not guaranteed to work from all technologies; most notably, it does not work from landlines. In order to encourage use of 000, mobile telephones imported commercially into Australia are required to be programmed to treat 000 in the same fashion as 112 (i.e. dialling with key lock enabled, use of any carrier, preferential routing, etc.). On older or privately imported (e.g. roaming from another country) telephones, 000 may not receive such preferential treatment.

Local Rate and FreeCall numbers (13, 180) 
Australia uses the free call prefix 1800 for 10 digit freecall numbers. This is similar to the North American or NANPA prefix 1–800, but while in North America, the 1 is the long-distance or toll prefix and 800 is the area code; 1800 in Australia is itself a "virtual area code" (prior to the introduction of 8-digit numbers, the free call code was 008). There are also seven digit freecall numbers beginning with 180 – the only numbers currently allocated begin with 1802.

The 13 and 1300 numbers are known as Local Rate Numbers or SmartNumbers.  They are also known as priority 13, and priority 1300 numbers.  These work across large areas (potentially the whole of Australia) and charge the caller only a low cost, routing the call to the appropriate place in a given area. For example, a company could have the number 139999 and have the telephone company set it up so that calls made in Melbourne would route to their Melbourne number, calls made in Brisbane to their Brisbane number, and calls made anywhere else in Australia route to their Sydney number, all at a local charge cost to the caller. 13 numbers were not available before the introduction of the current 8-digit local numbering plan. Businesses looking for local callers tend to connect to a "1300" number. Note that these numbers are called "Local Rate" and not "Local" numbers, so do not necessarily cost the same as a local call: Indeed, many (landline and mobile) phone plans do not even include them in the "included" credit and/or charge them at a higher rate than "normal" numbers.

Though promoted as "local call rate" calls, calls to 13 and 1300 numbers cost more than a local call fee for those people using VoIP and having all local and national calls free.

1800, 1300 and 13 numbers are reverse charge networks. Other than the length of the number, the differences between a 13 number and a 1300 number is that the shorter number has a higher fee for the owner of the number: there should be no difference in cost to the caller. A call to an 1800 is free when dialled from a landline, and mobile phones since 2014. It depends on the individual mobile plan as how 13 and 1300 numbers are charged: all plans no longer charge for 1800 but 13 and 1300 may still be charged at a high rate, or outside included calls.

These numbers "forward" to a geographic or mobile number. The recipient is usually charged at a set rate per second for each call, depending on plan and destination.

Premium numbers (19)
190x (not to be confused with 0198) is the prefix for premium rate services (e.g. recorded information, competition lines, psychics, phone sex, etc.). (Prior to the introduction of 8-digit local numbers, the prefix was 0055.) 190 numbers incur a rate as charged by the provider – either at a per-minute rate (limited at $5.50 per minute) or a fixed rate (up to $38.50 per call). The latter method is most often used for fax-back services, where a timed charge is not appropriate. Costs of 190 calls for competitions involving chance are also often limited by state legislation to $0.55 per call. (In the previous numbering plan, 0055 numbers were limited to three bands: Premium Rate, Value Rate and Budget Rate, with per minute rates of $0.75, $0.60 and $0.40 respectively.)

Other numbers beginning with 19 are used for premium-rate SMS services. These were originally trialled using the 188 prefix. These can range from a standard SMS cost (usually 25c), up to 55c for competition use, to several dollars for other uses, such as unique bid auctions.

International access
The main international prefix is 0011. (E.164 international format is supported from phones with the ability to dial the '+' symbol.)

There are other codes for using a non-default carrier or a special plan:
 0014 will route through the Primus network
 0018 will route through the Telstra network
 0019 will route through the Optus network

Formerly, 0015 would route through Telstra on a special mode for international faxing. Telstra has retired this code.

Carrier selection codes (14xx) are now also used, and carrier pre-selection is widely used.

Carrier selection codes
These four-digit numbers are dialled before the destination number to complete and bill a call by a carrier other than the subscriber's service provider. For example, to use AAPT to call a number in Tokyo, Japan, subscribers would dial 1414 0011 81 3 xxxx xxxx, or to use Optus to call a number in Perth they would dial 1456 08 xxxx xxxx. It is not clear if all these prefixes will actually work. Not all carriers have interconnect agreements with each other

 1410 – Telstra
 1411 – Telstra
 1412 – TPG (Was Chime)
 1413 – Telstra
 1414 – TPG (Was AAPT)
 1415 – Vodafone
 1422 – Premier Technologies
 1423 – TPG (was Soul Pattinson)
 1428 – Verizon Australia
 1431 – Vodafone Hutchison
 1434 – Symbio Networks
 1441 – TPG (was Soul Pattinson)
 1447 – TransACT
 1450 – Pivotel
 1455 – Netsip
 1456 – Optus
 1464 – TPG (Was Agile)
 1466 – Primus
 1468 – Telpacific
 1469 – Lycamobile
 1474 – Powertel
 1477 – Vocus
 1488 – Symbio Networks
 1499 – VIRTUTEL

Supplementary control services 
1831 – Block Caller ID sending
1832 – Unblock Caller ID sending

Other numbers and codes

Test numbers

 Telstra Landline Test numbers
 12722123 – Playback the last connected or current landline number (add 1832 in front for private numbers)
 12722199 – Ringback the current landline number
 Telstra payphone test numbers
 12722101 - will only take 1¢ per metering pulses
 0488076353 - will test the SMS function of the phone 
 Optus landline test numbers
 1272312 – Playback the last connected or current landline number
 1272399 – Ringback the current landline number
 From other subscribers including VoIP providers
 1800801920 – Playback the last connected or current landline number
 Other
 12711 – Current long-distance Carrier Name

Historic numbering plans

2010s

Many old numbers were officially removed from the Telecommunications Numbering Plan in the 2015 version, whether in the replacement version or a previous variation.

 018 AMPS phone numbers are completely removed.
 0500 Personal Numbers are removed.
 Unused prefixes such as 114 mass calling service are removed.

1990s

0055 numbers were previously premium-rate numbers, but have been moved into 190 numbers before 1999.

The original toll-free area code was 008, but the format was changed to 1800.

Directory assistance used various numbers: 013 for local calls, 0175 for other national calls, and 0103 for international. The two domestic numbers have been replaced with 1223, while 0103 was replaced with 1225. Other numbers for directory assistance, often with a call connection option, exist depending on the carrier.

011 was initially the code for the operator, 0011 later became the international exit code.

014 was originally the number for the time, (later 1104), which was changed to 1194 in 1976.

0176 was originally the code for the operator when calling from a Public Telephone. It became the code for the reverse-charge call operator, which was moved to 12550. Alternatively 3rd-party companies exist. See Collect call#Australia

1960s

Up to this time, the maximum size of an Australian telephone number was six digits.

Until the early 1960s, the first one or two digits of telephone numbers in metropolitan areas were alphabetic, with each letter representing a distinct number on the telephone dial. Each one-letter or two-letter code signified an exchange within an urban area. Rural and regional areas typically relied on manual exchanges, or only one automatic exchange for the whole town, so rural and regional numbers did not feature these letter prefixes. The use of a letter-number combination also served as a memory aid as it was easier to remember than a string of digits in the days when such things were not as common.

Unlike the three (or fewer) letters associated with each of the numbers on the dials of telephones of the UK Director telephone system, which was used in London and other large British cities, Australia used a system of letters associated with the ten digits available on a telephone dial, where each of these letters were chosen because their "name" (when pronounced, in English) could not be confused with any of the other nine letters of the English/Latin alphabet which were also used.

Since the initial digits of 1 and 0 (ten) were not used, this gave the telephone company concerned up to 8 regions with main exchanges and up to ten sub-exchanges in each metropolitan area – a total of up to 80 individual exchanges of 10,000 numbers in each with up to only 800,000 individual "numbers" in any metropolitan area concerned. This limited capacity led to the need for a seven- or eight-digit numbering system, to allow for more "numbers" within a given area.

Because of the growth of the telephone network, Australia now has eight-digit telephone numbers within four areas.

This former alphanumeric scheme was significantly different from the current system used for SMS messages.

The former alphanumeric scheme was:

 A = 1;
 B = 2;
 F = 3;
 J = 4;
 L = 5;
 M = 6;
 U = 7;
 W = 8;
 X = 9;
 Y = 0

The letters did not relate to any exchange name. For example, the exchange prefix for Essendon was FU (which translated to 37 and later became the 37x [then 937x] exchange used by the whole City of Essendon [which became the City of Moonee Valley in late 1994]). Although Melbourne city numbers began with 6, it was only rarely, and probably by accident, that any other exchanges had matching letters. Numbers using the old alphanumeric scheme were written as ab.xxxx, for example FU 1234 (the actual train of digits sent to the phone was "371234") or MW 5550 (685550). Seven-digit numbers started appearing as early as 1960, and were all numerical from the start. There were still some six-digit numbers and at least one five-digit number in Melbourne as late as 1989, but by the 1990s, they all had been converted to seven-digit numbers. Footscray used six-digit numbers in exchange code 68 until 1987, when they were changed to 687 or 689.

The old call back number was 199, and could be used on public payphones, and private numbers too. This was moved to a new number 12722199.

See also
Former Australian dialling codes
Telecommunications in Australia

References

ITU allocations list

External links
 List of Telephone Exchanges
 Excel file of exchange prefixes via Telstra Wholesale site
 Telecommunications Numbering Plan 1997
 Telecommunications Numbering Plan 2015
 All Areas by Prefix (archive.org snapshot of old version of official site)
 All Areas by Prefix (official site - expand heading Geographic numbers)
 All Areas by Prefix (ATO)
 Australia Phone Number

 
Australia
Australia communications-related lists